Robert Bernstein may refer to:
* Robert Bernstein (comics) (1919–1988), American comic book writer
 Robert A. Bernstein (born 1961), American attorney and politician
 Robert L. Bernstein (1923–2019), American publisher and human rights activist
 Robert Root-Bernstein (born 1953), American professor of life sciences

See also
 Bernstein